Sir Thomas Henry Cotton, MBE (28 January 1907 – 22 December 1987) was an English professional golfer. He won the Open Championship in 1934, 1937 and 1948, becoming the leading British player of his generation. The Rookie of the Year award in European Tour is named after him.

Early life
Cotton was born in Holmes Chapel, then known as Church Hulme, near Congleton, Cheshire on 28 January 1907. He had an older brother, Leslie (born 1905), who also became a professional golfer. Cotton was brought up in Crystal Palace Road, East Dulwich, London. He later went to Reigate Grammar School, and then won a scholarship to Alleyn's School in Dulwich, South London. He was a useful cricketer, good enough to bat at number 3 for the school against Surrey Club and Ground, a team containing 5 professionals, at the age of 15. Cotton and his brother had already taken up a second sport, golf, at the Aquarius Golf Club in Honor Oak from 1920. In September 1921 the Cotton brothers played in the first Boys Amateur Championship, then limited to boys under 16. Henry played the eventual winner, Donald Mathieson, on the first day, losing by 2 holes, Cotton was all square after 16 holes but lost the 17th after being incorrectly penalised for placing his bag in a bunker. Cotton also played in the 1922 Boys Championship, again losing in the first round. In June 1923 Cotton won the Hutchings Trophy, the Championship of the Aquarius Club.

Career
Cotton left school in the summer of 1923 and soon started his career as a professional golfer, joining his older brother Leslie as assistant teaching professional at Fulwell Golf Club under Fulwell's professional, George Oke, who had been at Honor Oak since 1921. Within a year Cotton had left and become an assistant at Rye Golf Club near Rye, East Sussex. During his time at Rye, Cotton travelled to Scotland to try to qualify for the 1925 Open Championship. However scores of 85 and 82 left him well outside the qualifying mark of 158. In March 1926, aged 19, he became the professional at Langley Park Golf Club near Beckenham in Kent, replacing Frank Ball who emigrated to America later the same year.

Cotton remained at Langley Park until the end of 1932 when he moved to the Waterloo Golf Club near Brussels, Belgium. While there, Cotton improved his game and by the time he left he was one of Britain's leading golfers. In 1926, Cotton again failed to qualifying for the Open Championship but later in the year qualified for the knock-out stages of the Yorkshire Evening News Tournament and the News of the World Match Play and ended the season by winning the Kent Professional Championship.

He achieved fame during the 1930s and 1940s, with three victories in The Open Championship (1934, 1937, and 1948). His record round of 65, made during the 1934 Open Championship, led to the Dunlop golf company issuing the famous 'Dunlop 65' ball. Cotton placed 17 times in the top-10 at the Open. Cotton also succeeded in winning many titles on the European circuit during the 1930s. During this period he was a professional at the Ashridge Golf Club.

Cotton was trained as a pilot since at least 1930. During World War II he served with the Royal Air Force, and raised money for the Red Cross by playing exhibition matches and shows. This earned him an MBE. At this time he was stationed at RAF Halton and was closely involved with what is now the Chiltern Forest Golf club. He added three holes to the course (taking it from six to nine) and made other improvements.

Cotton was a playing member of three British Ryder Cup teams, in 1929, 1937 and 1947, serving as captain of the team in 1947, and was a non-playing captain in 1953. He competed only occasionally in the United States, without notable success.

Personal life and retirement

On 11 December 1939 Cotton married Isabel-Maria Estanguet de Moss, the daughter of a Buenos Aires beef merchant, who was taking golf lessons from Cotton and was known by her nickname 'Toots'. She supported Cotton during his golf competitions and affected the way he would dress for them.

Following his retirement from competitive golf in the early 1950s, Cotton became a successful architect of golf courses, including designing the Penina Golf and Resort and Pestana Alto Golf on the Algarve, Portugal. He was hired by Baron Edmond Adolphe de Rothschild to design the golf course in Megève, Haute-Savoie, France. Cotton wrote 10 books, and established the Golf Foundation, which helped thousands of young boys and girls get started in golf.

Cotton loved the high life, including champagne and bespoke tailored clothes. He lived for a while in a suite in a 5-star hotel, and later bought an estate complete with butler and full staff, traveling everywhere in a Rolls-Royce. Cotton stated in his book "This Game Of Golf" that his hero was Walter Hagen who was a flashy dresser and a high-roller. Cotton marveled at how Hagen would stay up all night playing cards for money on the eve of a tournament and how Hagen would go straight to the first tee without even warming up beforehand..

Cotton was inducted into the World Golf Hall of Fame in 1980. He was knighted in the New Year's Day Honours of 1988, named a Knight Bachelor. This was reported in some media as a "posthumous knighthood" because he had died by the time it was publicly announced. However, the Queen had approved the award and he had accepted it, before his death.

Tournament wins (37)

Important wins (30)

Other wins (7)
Note: This list may be incomplete.
1926 Kent Professional Championship
1927 Kent Professional Championship
1928 Kent Professional Championship
1929 Kent Professional Championship
1930 South Open (Argentina), Kent Professional Championship
1948 White Sulphur Springs Tournament (USA)

Major championships

Wins (3)

Results timeline

Note: Cotton never played in the PGA Championship.

NYF = Tournament not yet founded
NT = No tournament
CUT = missed the half-way cut
"T" indicates a tie for a place

Team appearances
Ryder Cup (representing Great Britain): 1929 (winners), 1937, 1947 (captain), 1953 (non-playing captain)
Seniors vs Juniors (representing the Juniors): 1928
France–Great Britain Professional Match (representing Great Britain): 1929 (winners)
Coronation Match (representing the Ladies and Professionals): 1937
Joy Cup (representing the British Isles): 1954 (winners, captain), 1955 (winners, non-playing captain), 1956 (winners, captain)

Gallery

References

External links

Sir Henry Cotton Championship Course at Penina.com

English male golfers
Winners of men's major golf championships
World Golf Hall of Fame inductees
Ryder Cup competitors for Europe
Golf writers and broadcasters
Golf course architects
People in sports awarded knighthoods
Knights Bachelor
Members of the Order of the British Empire
Royal Air Force officers
Royal Air Force personnel of World War II
People educated at Dulwich College
People educated at Alleyn's School
People from Holmes Chapel
1907 births
1987 deaths